The Apostolic Prefecture of South Seas Islands (or of the Islands of the Great Ocean or of Oceania) was a short-lived (1830–1836) Latin Catholic missionary pre-diocesan jurisdiction in the South Seas (now mainly New Zealand).

It was exempt, i.e. directly dependent on the Holy See, not part of any ecclesiastical province.

History 
 On 10 January 1830, it was established as Apostolic Prefecture of South Seas Islands, on territory split off from the then Apostolic Prefecture of Bourbon (now diocese of Réunion)
 On 8 June 1833, it lost vast territory to establish the Apostolic Vicariate of Eastern Oceania
 On 10 January 1836 it was suppressed, its huge remaining territory being reassigned to establish the Apostolic Vicariate of Western Oceania.

Ordinaries 
(incomplete?; Latin Rite)

 Gabriel-Henri-Jérôme de Solages (1830 – death 1832.12.08), previously Apostolic Prefect of mother jurisdiction Bourbon (Réunion) (1829 – 1832.12.08)
 ?vacancy ?

Source and External links

References

External links 
 GigaCatholic

Apostolic prefectures
Former Roman Catholic dioceses in Oceania
Catholic Church in New Zealand